Let No-One Live Rent Free in Your Head is the second studio album by Scottish musician Nicolette, released in 1996 by Talkin' Loud.  peaking at number 36 on the UK Albums Chart.

Critical reception

John Bush of AllMusic, who gave the album 4.5 stars out of 5, praised the album's production and called it "one of the most glowing moments of mid-'90s vocal electronica". NME named it the 27th best album of 1996.

Track listing

Charts

References

External links
 

1996 albums
Nicolette (musician) albums
Talkin' Loud albums